The 1950 football season was São Paulo's 21st season since the club's founding in 1930.

Overall

{|class="wikitable"
|-
|Games played || 52 (7 Torneio Rio-São Paulo, 22 Campeonato Paulista, 23 Friendly match)
|-
|Games won || 30 (2 Torneio Rio-São Paulo, 13 Campeonato Paulista, 15 Friendly match)
|-
|Games drawn ||  12 (1 Torneio Rio-São Paulo, 5 Campeonato Paulista, 6 Friendly match)
|-
|Games lost ||  10 (4 Torneio Rio-São Paulo, 4 Campeonato Paulista, 2 Friendly match)
|-
|Goals scored || 139
|-
|Goals conceded || 81
|-
|Goal difference || +58
|-
|Best result || 10–0 (H) v Guarani - Campeonato Paulista - 1950.11.11
|-
|Worst result || 1–4 (A) v Corinthians - Torneio Rio-São Paulo - 1949.12.28
|-
|Most appearances || 
|-
|Top scorer || 
|-

Friendlies

Official competitions

Torneio Rio-São Paulo

Record

Campeonato Paulista

Record

External links
official website 

Association football clubs 1950 season
1950
1950 in Brazilian football